Lu Xiangyang is a Chinese entrepreneur and a founder of the battery and auto maker BYD Company.

Lu Xiangyang was born in Anhui. He started his career at the local branch of the People's Bank of China. At the beginning of the 1990s, he moved to Guangdong province, where he started working for brokers. Later he even founded Guangzhou Youngy Management and Investment Group. In 1995, he invested 5 million renminbi in the newly formed company BYD, the founder of which was his cousin Wang Chuanfu. The share in the BYD afterwards brought Xiangyang the majority of his fortune. Later Lu Xiangyang acquired 70% of the world’s second-largest lithium mine in Sichuan and a cobalt mine in the Democratic Republic of Congo.

Lu Xiangyang made the 2022 Forbes Billionaires List with an estimated wealth of $15.7 billion and occupied the 114th position.

References 

1962 births
Living people
Chinese businesspeople
Chinese billionaires
20th-century Chinese businesspeople
21st-century Chinese businesspeople